Anastasia Has the Answers (1986) is a young adult novel by Lois Lowry. It is the sixth of a series of books that Lowry wrote about Anastasia and her younger brother Sam.

Critical reception
Carolyn Noah of the Worcester Public Library in Massachusetts reviewed the book in the School Library  Journal. She highlights how each chapter begins with Anastasia's attempt at describing events in a journalistic manner, a feature unique to this book in the series. She further explains: "The language in Lowry's stories about Anastasia is always natural, but ... Answers also benefits from this stylistic variation. The surrounding characters, from baby brother Same playing funeral on the floor to bereaved "Clark Gablish" Uncle George are colorful and quirky and distinct. [...] The story's other elements fall, quite literally, into their own likely and lively places. Not only does Anastasia have the answers, but she's at the top of her form."

References

External links 
 Description from Lowry's website.
Lowry's website
Complete list of books by Lowry

1986 American novels
American young adult novels
Novels by Lois Lowry